Ladin may refer to:
Ladin language, a language in northern Italy, often classified as a Rhaeto-Romance language
Ladin people, the inhabitants of the Dolomite Alps region of northern Italy

See also 
Laden (disambiguation)
Ladino (disambiguation)
Ladins (disambiguation)

Language and nationality disambiguation pages